Vilhelmina Municipality is a municipality in Västerbotten County in northern Sweden. Its seat is located in Vilhelmina.

History
In 1804 the parish of Volgsjö was renamed Vilhelmina in honour of Queen Frederica Dorothea Wilhelmina of Sweden.

In 1947 the locality Vilhelmina was detached from the rural municipality with the same name, forming the market town (köping) of Vilhelmina. The two entities were reunited in 1965.

Geography
Like the rest of northern Sweden (Norrland), it is scarcely populated due to its inhospitable conditions and cold climate, but is superb for those who like wildlife and untouched nature.

The village of Malgovik, about 20 km north of Vilhelmina, holds the record for the lowest temperature ever recorded in Sweden. It was set on December 13, 1941, when the temperature dropped down to -53 °C.

Localities
There is only one locality (or urban area) in Vilhelmina Municipality:

Culture
Every July the town of Vilhelmina holds a festival called Hembygdsdagarna Vilhelmina. In addition to popular and folk music performances, tradition holds that a local engaged couple is selected each year to get married during the festival. The bride and groom lead a parade of fiddlers and other traditionally dressed Swedes through town to the church where the marriage is performed in front of all who wish to attend. They are not always able to find a couple willing to get married, however, so some years they hold the parade without an engaged couple, and hold a public church service instead of a wedding.

References

External links

Vilhelmina Municipality - Official site 
Article Vilhelmina from Nordisk familjebok, 1921 
Vilhelmina – An Adventure - Tourism PDF file
Live webcam in Vilhelmina

Municipalities of Västerbotten County